Vicia tetrasperma (syn. Ervum tetraspermum) the smooth tare, smooth vetch, lentil vetch or sparrow vetch, is a species of flowering plant in the bean family Fabaceae. It can be invasive.

Description
The pod is dehiscent.

Distribution
This vetch is native to Europe, Asia, and North Africa, and it can be found on other continents as an introduced species.

Habitat
Grassy places, local.

References

External links
Jepson Manual Treatment
USDA Plants Profile

Washington Burke Museum
Missouri Plants Photo Profile
AgroAtlas Economic Plants
Photo gallery

tetrasperm
Flora of Europe
Flora of North Africa
Flora of temperate Asia